St. Catherine or St. Katherine may refer to a number of saints named Catherine, or:

Geography

Canada
St. Catharines, a city in Ontario
St. Catharines (electoral district), federal
St. Catharines (provincial electoral district), in Ontario

United Kingdom
St Catherine, Somerset, a village and civil parish in Somerset, England
St Catherine's, Lincoln, an area of Lincoln, Lincolnshire, England
St Catherine's Hill, Dorset, a hill in Dorset, England
St. Catherine's Hill, Hampshire, a chalk hill in Hampshire, England
St Catherine's Hill, Surrey, a sandstone hill in Surrey, England
St. Catherine's Down, a chalk down on the Isle of Wight, England
St Catherine's Point, the southernmost point on the Isle of Wight, England
St. Catherine's Valley, a valley in South Gloucestershire, England
St Catherines, Argyll, a village in Argyll and Bute, Scotland
St Catherine's Island, Pembrokeshire, Wales
St Katharine's by the Tower, a religious precinct in London (1147-1825)
St Katharine Docks, a former dock and now a mixed-use district in central London

United States
St. Catherine, Florida, an unincorporated community
Saint Catharine, Kentucky, an unincorporated community
St. Catharine, Missouri, an unincorporated community
St. Catherines Island, on the coast of Georgia
St. Katherine's Historic District, in Davenport, Iowa
Lake St. Catherine (Louisiana), a lake in New Orleans, Louisiana

Elsewhere
Saint Catherine, Egypt, a city in the South Sinai Governorate, Egypt
Saint Catherine Parish, a parish in Middlesex, Jamaica

Hospitals
 St Catherine's Health Centre, in Birkenhead, Merseyside, England
 St Catherine's Hospital, Doncaster, in Doncaster, South Yorkshire, England
 St. Catherine's Hospital, Rochester a 1315 leper hospital in Rochester, Kent

Monasteries and convents
 Saint Catherine's Monastery, a monastery in Saint Catherine, Egypt
 St Catharine's Convent, Augsburg, Germany
 St Catharine's Convent, Edinburgh, Scotland
 St. Catherine of Sienna Convent, a convent in Springfield, Kentucky
 St. Catherine's Priory, Lincoln, a priory in Lincolnshire, England
 St. Catherine's Priory, Ribe, a Dominican priory in Denmark
 St. Catherine's Priory, Roskilde, a Dominican priory in Denmark
 St. Katherine's Abbey, Monisternagalliaghduff, an Augustinian nunnery in County Limerick, Ireland

Schools
 St Catherine's School (disambiguation), many schools, colleges and universities
 St Catharine's College, Cambridge, a college of Cambridge University
 St Catherine's College, Oxford, a college of Oxford University
 St Katherine's School, a secondary school in Somerset, England
 St. Katherine College, a four-year undergraduate college in Encinitas, California

Art
 Saint Catherine of Alexandria (Raphael), a c. 1507–1509 painting by Raphael
 Saint Catherine (Lotto), a 1522 painting by Lorenzo Lotto
 Saint Catherine Reading, a c. 1530 painting by Correggio
 Saint Catherine (Caravaggio), a c. 1598 painting by Caravaggio

Other 
 St. Catherine (album), a 2015 album by the band Ducktails
 MV St Catherine, a 1983 ferry, crossing Portsmouth to Fishbourne, Isle of Wight, England
 St. Catharine (Waldorf, Maryland) or Dr. Samuel A. Mudd House, a historic house in Maryland
 St Catherine's Castle, a small device fort in Cornwall, England
 St Catherine's Court, a Tudor manor house in north of Bath, England
 St Catherine's Fort, a Palmerston fort
 St. Catherine International Airport, in Saint Catherine, Egypt
 St. Catherine's Day or Kadripäev, a celebration in Estonia
 Feast of Saint Catherine, a religious and civil celebration annually held in Italy and other locations
 Order of Saint Catherine, an award of Imperial Russia
 Order of Saint Catherine the Great Martyr, an award of Russia established in 2012

See also
 St. Catherine's Church (disambiguation)
Sainte-Catherine (disambiguation)
St Catherine's Chapel (disambiguation)
St Catherine's College (disambiguation)
St. Catherine's Priory (disambiguation)
Santa Catalina (disambiguation)
Santa Catarina (disambiguation)
Santa Caterina (disambiguation)
Święta Katarzyna (disambiguation)